Elections were held in the Australian state of Queensland on 29 November 1980 to elect the 82 members of the state's Legislative Assembly.

The election resulted in a fifth consecutive victory for the National-Liberal Coalition under Joh Bjelke-Petersen. It was the ninth victory of the National Party in Queensland since it first came to office in 1957.

Result

The election saw little change from the 1977 election. The Coalition Government was returned to office, although Labor gained two seats and the Liberals lost two. The Liberal decline continued, and tensions between the Coalition parties increased.

Key dates

Results

|}

Seats changing hands 

 In addition, the Liberal party retained Redcliffe, which was won from the National Party at the 1979 by-election.

Post-election pendulum

See also
Candidates of the Queensland state election, 1980

References

Elections in Queensland
1980 elections in Australia
1980s in Queensland
November 1980 events in Australia